Al-Shajara (also spelled ash-Shajarah) is a town in southern Syria, administratively part of the Daraa Governorate, located west of Daraa, in between the Israeli-occupied Golan Heights and Jordan. Nearby localities include Saham al-Jawlan to the east, Nafia to the north, Jamla to the northwest and Bayt Ara to the southwest.

History
In  the Ottoman  tax registers of 1596, it was located in the nahiya of  Jawlan Sarqi,  Qada of Hawran, with the name of Sajara. It had a population of 5 households and 2  bachelors, all Muslims. They paid a fixed tax-rate of 25% on agricultural products, including  wheat, barley, summer crops,  goats and beehives, winter pasture/grass lands, in addition to occasional revenues; a total of 1,988  akçe.

In 1908 the Darʿā–Haifa railway line started operating and ash-Shajara was connected with the ash-Shajara train station far south of the city in the valley of the Yarmuk, in this section drowned in the waters of the Al-Wehda Dam since 2007.

Modern era
According to the Syria Central Bureau of Statistics, al-Shajara had a population of 6,567 in the 2004 census. It is the administrative center of the al-Shajara nahiyah (subdistrict) which consisted of 17 localities with a combined population of 34,206 in 2004.

As of September 2016, al-Shajara was controlled by the Khalid ibn al-Walid Army of ISIL.

In an offensive on ISIS' pocket in southern Syria, the Syrian Armed Forces took control of this former ISIS stronghold in July 2018.

References

Bibliography

External links
Map of the town, Google Maps
Kafer el Ma-map; 21K

Populated places in Daraa District
Towns in Syria